Latifa Baka (born 1964), is a Moroccan author of novels and short stories.

Publications
Novel
De Depuis ce temps-là, Ministère de la culture, Rabat, 2005.

Short stories
 In Mediterraneans: Voices from Morocco (a quarterly publication, winter 1999), the 11th issue  of a bilingual quarterly that showcases the most interesting new writing of Morocco in both English and French (including short stories, poems and essays written originally in French, standard Arabic and Moroccan Arabic) Baka was presented by an intensely personal short story.
 In Zapatos sin tacón, an anthology of Arab female writers, edited by Ami Elad-Bouskila, with stories by Hanan Al-Shaikh and Liana Badr, Baka contributed the title story. She is said to have a mordant style, faithfully representing the collection as an image and also graphically reflecting the content and message of the others. Baka's story is about a group of female patients who escape from their hospital beds, leaping through a window (under the direction of "Patient No. 36, an anarchist") in order to attend an evening of popular songs.

References

Livres hebdo, ed. Editions professionnelles du livre, no.340-343 1999, p. 54

External links
Latifa Baka, Centro Cultural al-Andalus . Retrieved January 7, 2022.
BAQA, Latifa, Literatura Marroqui] . Retrieved January 7, 2022.

1964 births
Living people
Moroccan writers in French
Moroccan women novelists
Moroccan novelists
Moroccan women short story writers
Moroccan short story writers
20th-century Moroccan women writers
21st-century Moroccan women writers
20th-century Moroccan writers
21st-century Moroccan writers